Terrades is a municipality in the comarca of the Alt Empordà in Catalonia, Spain. It is situated to the west of Figueres, above the valley of the Muga river, and is linked to the rest of the comarca by the GE-510 road.

Demography

References

 Panareda Clopés, Josep Maria; Rios Calvet, Jaume; Rabella Vives, Josep Maria (1989). Guia de Catalunya, Barcelona: Caixa de Catalunya.  (Spanish).  (Catalan).

External links 
Official website
 Government data pages 

Municipalities in Alt Empordà
Populated places in Alt Empordà